The 2022 Mountain West Conference football season will be the 24th season of College football for the Mountain West Conference. It will be part of the 2022 NCAA Division I FBS football season. 12 teams will compete in the conference during the season. The season is scheduled to being August 27 and conclude on December 3 with the Mountain West Conference Football Championship Game. The full schedule for the season was released on February 16, 2022

Previous season

In the 2021 Mountain West Conference football season, Utah State won the Mountain division, while San Diego State won the West division. In the conference championship game, Utah State took victory by a score of 46–13.

Preseason

Mountain West Media
The Mountain West Media days was held at the Mandalay Bay Las Vegas on July 20 and 21.

Preseason Poll
The Preseason Media Poll was released July 20, 2022. Boise State was picked to win the Mountain division, while Fresno State was picked to win the West division.

Preseason All-Conference Team
The Preseason All-Conference Team was announced only July 21, 2022.

Offensive Player of the Year: Jake Haener (Senior, Fresno State quarterback)
Defensive Players of the Year: Cade Hall (Senior, San Jose State defensive lineman) & Patrick McMorris (Senior, San Diego State defensive back)
Special Teams Player of the Year: Jordan Byrd (Senior, San Diego State punt and kick returner)

Preseason individual awards
The following list contains Mountain West players who were included on preseason watch lists for national awards.

Coaches

Coaching changes
On December 2, 2021 Colorado State announced that they had fired head coach Steve Addazio after two seasons. Jay Norvell, who had been at Nevada, was hired to take the position at Colorado State.

On December 8, 2021, Fresno State announced that Jeff Tedford would rejoin the school as head coach to replace the departing Kalen DeBoer. Teford had previously been head coach at Fresno State from 2017–2019, but had left the school after 2019 due to health issues.

On December 10, 2021, Nevada announced that Oregon defensive coordinator Ken Wilson would replace Jay Norvell as head coach. Wilson had been an assistant coach in various positions for Nevada from 1989–2012 prior to being hired as head coach.

On January 14, Hawaii head coach Todd Graham resigned from his position amid controversy surrounding mistreatment of players. On January 22, Hawaii announced Nevada assistant coach Timmy Chang as the new head coach.

Head coaches

Post-season changes
On November 28, UNLV announced that they had fired head coach Marcus Arroyo. Arroyo posted a 7–23 record with the school over three years. UNLV announced on December 6 that former Missouri head coach Barry Odom would become the new head coach for the 2023 season.

Rankings

Schedule
The schedule for the 2022 Mountain West football season was announced on February 16, 2022.

All times Mountain time.

Week 0

Week 1

Week 2

Week 3

Week 4

Week 5

Week 6

Week 7

Week 8

Week 9

Week 10

Week 11

Week 12

Week 13

Week 14 – Mountain West Conference Championship Game

Postseason

Bowl Games

Selection of teams
Bowl eligible (7): Air Force, Boise State, Fresno State, San Diego State, San Jose State, Utah State, Wyoming
Bowl ineligible (5): Colorado State, Hawaii, Nevada, New Mexico, UNLV

Mountain West records vs. other conferences
2022–2023 records against non-conference foes:

Regular Season

Postseason

Mountain West vs Power 5 matchups
This is a list of games the Mountain West has scheduled versus power conference teams (ACC, Big Ten, Big 12, Pac-12, BYU, Notre Dame and SEC). All rankings are from the current AP Poll at the time of the game.

Mountain West vs Group of Five matchups
The following games include Mountain West teams competing against teams from the American, C-USA, MAC or Sun Belt.

Mountain West vs FBS independents matchups
The following games include Mountain West teams competing against FBS Independents, which includes Army, Liberty, New Mexico State, UConn, or UMass.

Mountain West vs. FCS matchups
The following games include Mountain West teams competing against FCS schools.

Awards and honors

Player of the week honors

Mountain West Individual Awards
The following individuals received postseason honors as voted by the Mountain West Conference football coaches at the end of the season.

All-conference teams
The following players were selected as part of the Mountain West's All-Conference Teams.

References